is a Japanese snowboarder. She won a gold medal in slopestyle at the FIS Freestyle Ski and Snowboarding World Championships 2015. She started snowboarding professionally in 2005.

References

External links

Japanese female snowboarders
1998 births
Living people
Snowboarders at the 2018 Winter Olympics
Snowboarders at the 2022 Winter Olympics
Olympic snowboarders of Japan
People from Kumamoto
X Games athletes
21st-century Japanese women